Mart Kampus (born 12 December 1961 in Tartu) is an  Estonian stage, television and radio actor and theatre director.

From 1985-1995 and again from 2000-2001 he worked at the Estonian Puppet Theatre. From 1995-1997 he worked at the Von Krahl Theatre. Then from 1997-2000 he was the head of Tartu Lasteteater. Since 2001, he has been working as a freelancer.

Director's works

 "Ansomardi Jalgsema järv" (1990; also played a role there)
 "Piumini ja Kampuse Seme ja maailm" (1992)
 "Wilde'i Noor kuningas" (1994, Rakvere Theatre)

References

Living people
1961 births
Estonian male stage actors
Estonian male television actors
Estonian male radio actors
Estonian theatre directors
Tallinn University alumni
Male actors from Tartu